Michelle de Swarte (born 1980) is an English actress, comedian, presenter, and former model. She starred in the Netflix series The Duchess.

Early life
De Swarte was born in Lewisham, South London to a Jewish mother and a Jamaican father and grew up in Brixton. She left school at 14.

Career
De Swarte was scouted by a modeling agency at 19 while working at a bar in Clapham. She landed gigs in New York where she would discover comedy. She has appeared on a number of panel shows for Channel 4, BBC, ITV and Comedy Central. She recorded an Edinburgh Fringe Festival audiobook for Penguin Books. Her other TV credits include presenting Emmy nominated series Woman with Gloria Steinem, The Fashion Show on ITV2, BBC Three current affairs debate show Free Speech and appearances on I’m A Celebrity Get Me Out of Here Now! on ITV.  She also hosted the celebrity gossip show Dirty Digest on E4, which she co-devised.

De Swarte's beauty product campaigns include Make-up Art Cosmetics, Sephora and Neutrogena. She has also been photographed for Burberry, Tommy Hilfiger, Cartier, Betsey Johnson, Michael Kors, Baby Phat, H&M, Gap and Levis, by photographers such as Mario Testino, Peter Lindbergh, Patrick Demarchelier and Steven Meisel, and featured in fashion spreads for Harper's Bazaar, Italian Vanity Fair and V. She modeled for Copperwheat Blundell (Ready-to-Wear Fall/Winter 2000 fashion show), Luella, Missoni (Ready-to-Wear Spring/Summer 2002 fashion shows), and during the Ready-to-Wear Fall/Winter 2002 fashion week she modeled for Dolce & Gabbana, Gucci, John Galliano and Versus Versace. But her career as a runway model stopped abruptly after she fell down repeatedly and removed her shoes while walking for the Gucci Fall/Winter 2002 Ready-to-Wear fashion show, where the catwalk was covered in faux sheepskin.

Turning to television, her TV credits include presenting celebrity gossip show,  Dirty Digest,  for E4, The Fashion Show, a 10-episode mini-series with George Lamb and Abbey Clancy which aired on ITV2 from September to November 2008, hosting the live broadcast of Arthur's Day celebrations, and being a talking head on BBC's The Noughties.. Was That It? in 2009. She also appeared on a number of panel shows for Channel 4, BBC, ITV and Comedy Central.

In 2015, she began reporting for Vice America doing a range of documentaries covering issues from FGM to female magicians, as well as the Emmy-nominated series Woman, produced by Gloria Steinem for Viceland USA.

She has also starred in the 2020 British comedy-drama series, The Duchess, and the 2022 British horror comedy limited series, The Baby.

On Live at the Apollo, she tells her Jeffrey Epstein-Jean-Luc Brunel encounter.

Personal life
De Swarte is bisexual. She lives between London and Greenpoint, Brooklyn.

TV productions

2008 The Fashion Show Princess Productions for ITV2 with George Lamb and Abigail Clancy
2009 Arthur's Day Celebrations for ITV2 and Sky with Cat Deeley and Ronan Keating
2009 I'm a Celebrity Get Me Out of Here Now ITV2 Filmed in Australia
2011 Dirty Digest for E4

References

Living people
1980 births
Bisexual actresses
Bisexual comedians
Black British actresses
Black British fashion people
Black British women comedians
Comedians from London
English female models
English people of Jamaican descent
English television presenters
English women comedians
Jewish English actresses
Jewish English comedians
English LGBT actors
English LGBT entertainers
People from Brixton
People from Lewisham
Actors with dyslexia
British LGBT comedians